Homoranthus binghiensis is a flowering plant in the family Myrtaceae and is endemic to a small area in northern New South Wales. It is an upright shrub with pointed leaves and usually paired yellowish to red flowers.

Description

Taxonomy and naming
Homoranthus binghiensis was first formally described in 2011 by John Hunter and Lachlan Copeland from a specimen collected in the Torrington State Recreation Area in 2000. The description was published in Telopea. The specific epithet (binghiensis) refers to the Permian sedimentary rocks in the Torrington area that have been known as binghi.

Distribution and habitat
This species grows at higher altitudes and is restricted to an area north-west of Torrington in northern New South Wales where it grows on shallow sandy soils in heath and shrubby woodland on or adjacent to granite outcrops.

Conservation status
This homoranthus is sometimes locally common, but known from only five or six populations and is classified as "endangered" under the New South Wales Government Threatened Species Conservation Act 1995. It is classified "vulnerable" and given a conservation code of 2VCt by Hunter and Copeland (2001).

References

Flora of New South Wales
Myrtales of Australia
binghiensis
Plants described in 2011